CBS Media Ventures, formerly CBS Paramount Domestic Television and CBS Television Distribution, is the television broadcast syndication arm of the CBS Entertainment Group division of Paramount Global founded on September 26, 2006 by CBS Corporation from a merger of CBS Paramount Domestic Television and King World Productions.

On launch, the division was led by King World CEO Roger King, who had his own production company merged into the division, until his death in 2007. It was formerly the main distribution arm of Paramount Media Networks (now handled by Paramount Global Distribution Group), the CBS and The CW television networks, which are currently handled by former parent company CBS Studios. The division also consists of CBS's home entertainment arm, CBS Home Entertainment.

Background 

The division has distribution rights to acquired television series, mini-series and made-for-television films from the following libraries:

 Desilu Productions
 The original Paramount Television
 Viacom Enterprises & Viacom Productions
 Republic Pictures Television
 Big Ticket Entertainment
 Spelling Television
 Worldvision Enterprises
 CBS Productions
 King World Productions
 Paramount Global's cable networks and television studios; and
 The majority of those by Westinghouse Broadcasting/Group W Productions and its own first-run broadcast syndication and off-network television shows

Paramount Global's flagship TV network, CBS, handles the television rights to much of its own archived theatrical films and those of sister film studio, Paramount Pictures. 

As CBS Television Distribution, the division formerly distributed the films from the libraries from Republic Pictures and Carolco Pictures. Until 2021, it was responsible for international television distribution rights to a few episodic serial programs which aired on HBO by Rysher Entertainment through its Paramount Global Content Licensing division; it has since being handled by Paramount Global Distribution Group. It also acted as an advertising sales representative for Debmar-Mercury, which is now owned by Lionsgate.

It is the 6th distribution name for CBS; CBS Television Film Sales (1952–1958) was the first, CBS Films, Inc. (1958–1968) was the second, CBS Enterprises (1968–1970) was the third, Eyemark Entertainment (1995–2000) was the fourth and CBS Paramount Domestic Television (2006–2007) was the fifth. The first 3 CBS distribution monikers were also used for a separate media company-turned-conglomerate connected to CBS which evolved to what is now historically known as the first/original incarnation of Viacom Inc..

The current moniker for the overseas distribution arm CBS Media Ventures since 2009 is CBS Studios International, now Paramount Global Distribution Group.

History

As CBS Television Distribution 

The previous distribution arm of CBS, CBS Paramount Domestic Television, merged with King World Productions to form CBS Television Distribution on September 26, 2006. On January 16, 2007, the studio launched a separate home video division, CBS Home Entertainment, for release of in-house-made shows on home video which would be distributed through the second incarnation of Viacom via Paramount Home Entertainment (which continues till date).

On February 25, 2007, CBS Television Distribution sold shows produced by Showtime to its parent subsidiary for self-syndication and broadcast. Later that year on August 18, CBS Television Distribution acquired a 50% stake in online talent search service Big Shot from Madison Road Entertainment and Maverick Television. On November 20, 2007, CBS Television Distribution began carrying first-run episodes of Everybody Hates Chris on its-owned stations and those of Fox in 2009, with CBS signing a deal with Nickelodeon on March 2, 2008 to bring reruns of Everybody Hates Chris to air for cable broadcast on its Nick at Nite channel.

On October 6, 2012, John Nogawski left his role as president of CBS Television Distribution with programming president Aaron Meyerson following in his footsteps a week later. On October 22, 2013, former executive of Telepictures, Hilary Estey McLoughlin, joined CBS Television Distribution as head of creative affairs. On March 2, 2015, CBS Television Distribution renewed Judge Judy through to the end of the 2019–20 television season.

With a growing international syndication business, CBS sought to split the group. On July 9, 2016, CBS hired former executive vice president and general sales manager for 20th Television's syndication arm and MyNetworkTV, Paul Franklin, as head of CBS Television Distribution with Nuñez returning to just being president of CBS Studios International.

On October 30, 2018, Armando Nuñez was named chief content licensing officer for CBS Corporation, replacing Scott Koondel who stepped down for a production deal with the CBS network, and president and chief executive officer for CBS Global Distribution Group, replacing outgoing executive Paul Franklin, which he added to his presidency at CBS Studios International.

On April 3, 2019, Debmar-Mercury signed an advertising sales deal with CBS Television Distribution as a replacement for 20th Century Fox Television (now 20th Television) which was acquired by The Walt Disney Company. CBS Television Distribution Media Sales is now responsible for the advertising sales for the Lionsgate/Revolution Studios television libraries, Family Feud, and The Wendy Williams Show. In June 2019, CBS Television Distribution announced that it would launch Dabl, a life style broadcasting network on September 9, 2019. On December 4, 2019, the second incarnation of Viacom Inc. and CBS Corporation merged to form ViacomCBS, making CBS Television Distribution the official television distribution label of Paramount Pictures, CBS and Paramount Media Networks, distributing original content from Nickelodeon, MTV, Comedy Central, Paramount Network and other networks owned by Paramount Global for the local market and Paramount Global Distribution Group for markets overseas.

As CBS Media Ventures 
On January 11, 2021, CBS Television Distribution rebranded to CBS Media Ventures, as an effort to unify the CBS brand.

Current programming 
 Note: All programming from/by CBS Media Ventures includes series distributed by predecessor companies/divisions like Paramount Domestic Television, Viacom Enterprises, Worldvision Enterprises, King World Productions and CBS Paramount Domestic Television.

First-run syndication 
 Dr. Phil (2002–present; produced by Harpo Productions (2002–2010) and Peteski Productions)
 The Drew Barrymore Show (2020–present; produced by Big Ticket Entertainment and Flower Films)
 Entertainment Tonight (1981–present; originally produced by Paramount Domestic Television)
 Hot Bench (2014–present; produced by Big Ticket Entertainment and Queen Bee Productions)
 Inside Edition (1989–present; originally produced by King World)
 Jeopardy! (1984–present; produced by Sony Pictures Television Studios)
 Rachael Ray (2006–present; produced by Harpo Productions and formerly, KWP Studios)
 Wheel of Fortune (1983–present; produced by Sony Pictures Television Studios)

Off-net syndication 
 Bull (2021–present)
 SEAL Team (2021–present)
 MacGyver (2021–present)

Network television 
 One Magnificent Morning (The CW) (2014–present; distributor of package to CW affiliates and The CW Plus)

See also 
 List of Paramount Global television programs

Folded companies/divisions 
 CBS Television Film Sales/CBS Films/CBS Enterprises (1952–1970)
 Viacom Productions/Enterprises (1971–1995)
 Desilu Productions (1963–1967)
 Paramount Domestic Television (1968–2006)
 Worldvision Enterprises (1973–1999)
 Group W Productions (1961–1996)
 Eyemark Entertainment (1996–1999)
 CBS Paramount Domestic Television (2006–2007)
 King World Productions (1964–2007)

References

External links 
 CBS Television Distribution Syndication Bible
 CBS Television Distribution Syndication Bible — (cached copy from Internet Archives)

CBS Media Ventures
Paramount Global subsidiaries
Television syndication distributors
American companies established in 2006
Mass media companies established in 2006